Poujols  is a commune in the Hérault department in the Occitanie region in southern France.

Population
At the 2017 census the population of the municipality was 164 inhabitants, creating a population density of 57 inhabitants/km2. The town reached peak population in the half a century following the French revolution but dwindled to a low following the Second World War, but has seen some growth in the early 21st century.

See also
Communes of the Hérault department

References

Communes of Hérault